McNeeley may refer to:

People
Kristofer McNeeley (born 1974), American actor
Peter McNeeley (born 1968), American boxer, son of Tom
Tom McNeeley (1937–2011), American boxer

Places
McNeeley Peak (Washington), a summit in Mount Rainier National Park, Washington, USA.
16268 Mcneeley, a main-belt asteroid

See also
McNeely